Bruno Filipe Tavares Pinheiro (born 21 August 1987 in Paranhos (Porto)) is a Portuguese professional footballer who plays as a centre-back or a defensive midfielder for A.R. São Martinho.

Club statistics

References

External links

National team data 

1987 births
Living people
Portuguese footballers
Footballers from Porto
Association football defenders
Association football midfielders
Primeira Liga players
Liga Portugal 2 players
Segunda Divisão players
Boavista F.C. players
G.D. Ribeirão players
Gil Vicente F.C. players
A.R. São Martinho players
Cypriot First Division players
Aris Limassol FC players
Ekstraklasa players
Widzew Łódź players
Israeli Premier League players
Maccabi Netanya F.C. players
Hapoel Haifa F.C. players
Football League (Greece) players
Niki Volos F.C. players
Apollon Smyrnis F.C. players
Indian Super League players
FC Goa players
Bruno Pinheiro
Bruno Pinheiro
Hong Kong Premier League players
Lee Man FC players
Portugal youth international footballers
Portugal under-21 international footballers
Portuguese expatriate footballers
Expatriate footballers in Cyprus
Expatriate footballers in Poland
Expatriate footballers in Israel
Expatriate footballers in Greece
Expatriate footballers in India
Expatriate footballers in Thailand
Expatriate footballers in Hong Kong
Portuguese expatriate sportspeople in Cyprus
Portuguese expatriate sportspeople in Poland
Portuguese expatriate sportspeople in Israel
Portuguese expatriate sportspeople in Greece
Portuguese expatriate sportspeople in India
Portuguese expatriate sportspeople in Thailand
Portuguese expatriate sportspeople in Hong Kong